The 2013–14 season was Unione Sportiva Sassuolo Calcio's first ever season in Serie A after having been promoted at the end of the 2012–13 season. The club struggled throughout the season and finished 17th, avoiding relegation. They were eliminated from the Coppa Italia in the fourth round.

Players

Competitions

Overall

Last updated: 18 May 2014

Serie A

League table

Matches

Coppa Italia

References

U.S. Sassuolo Calcio seasons
Sassuolo